Douglas Robert Hadow (30 May 1846 – 14 July 1865) was a British novice mountaineer who died on the descent after the first ascent of the Matterhorn.

Family
Hadow was born in 1846 at 49 York Terrace, Regent's Park, London, the son of Patrick Douglas Hadow (Chairman of the P. & O. Steam Navigation Company) and Emma Harriett Nisbet (daughter of Robert Parry Nisbet, of Southbroom House, Wiltshire), who married at Southbroom on 28 January 1845. Hadow's paternal great-grandfather was George Hadow, professor of Hebrew and Oriental Languages at the University of St Andrews, and one of his younger brothers was Frank Hadow, who won the Wimbledon championship in 1878.

Hadow was educated at Harrow School, where he and six of his brothers who also attended the school were known as the 'Harrow Hadows'.

First season in the Alps
In 1865, at the age of nineteen, Hadow undertook his first trip to the Alps as a protégé to Charles Hudson, a clergyman from Skillington in Lincolnshire, and a leading advocate of guideless climbing. Together they made a swift ascent of Mont Blanc and other climbs; these ascents – together with the backing of a climber of Hudson's stature – persuaded Edward Whymper that Hadow was a suitable companion for an attempt on the Matterhorn.

Whymper later wrote:
 In 'A Modern View of the 1865 Accident', the Alpine Club president Capt. J. P. Farrar (1917–19) concurred with this positive estimation of Hadow's ability:

Matterhorn accident

During the first ascent of the Matterhorn on 14 July 1865, Hadow was, however, challenged by the technical difficulties presented by the mountain. Whymper noticed his inexperience after the party had traversed onto what he termed the 'north-west face' whilst ascending the mountain. In a piece published by The Times shortly after the accident, he wrote: 

Hadow's slip on the descent of the mountain was the immediate cause of the accident. He was the second on the rope as the party went down and he slipped not far from the summit, dragging three members of the party (Lord Francis Douglas, Michel Croz and Charles Hudson) with him down the north face of the mountain to their deaths (the three other members of the party – Whymper and Taugwalder father and son – were saved when the rope between them and Douglas snapped). Claire Engel comments:

Hadow's body was recovered from the Matterhorn Glacier, and he was buried at the churchyard in Zermatt. One of Hadow's shoes can be seen in Zermatt's Matterhorn Museum, together with the snapped rope and other relics of the climb.

References

1846 births
1865 deaths
British mountain climbers
People educated at Harrow School
Mountaineering deaths
Sport deaths in Switzerland